Barnesmore Halt railway station served Barnesmore in County Donegal, Ireland.

The station opened as Barrack Bridge on 1 July 1891 on the West Donegal Railway line from Stranorlar to Donegal. It was renamed Barnesmore Halt on 1 September 1893.

It closed on 1 January 1960.

Routes

References

Disused railway stations in County Donegal
Railway stations opened in 1891
Railway stations closed in 1960